Taipei Economic and Cultural Office in Houston (TECO-Houston) represents the interests of Taiwan in the southern United States, functioning as a de facto consulate. The mission is located on the 20th Floor of 11 Greenway Plaza. It also oversees a Cultural Center at 10303 West Office Drive in the Westchase district of Houston.

TECO Houston's origins can be traced to 1937 when the government of the Republic of China established a consulate in Houston. The ROC was represented by a vice-consul. After opening the consulate of the People's Republic of China in 1979, the TECO mission opened its doors in 1992.

The mission serves Texas, Arkansas, Louisiana, Mississippi, and Oklahoma.

The office sponsors cultural exhibits such as the 2009 "Nation of Splendor: Taiwan, the Republic of China," which was hosted at 2 Allen Center in Downtown Houston. The mission also sponsors the Hou, Hsiao-Hsien Film Festival in San Antonio along with the Trinity University East Program.

After members of a Taiwanese religious movement in Garland, Texas, did not find God on television on a day in March 1998, an officer of TECO Houston offered assistance to members of the movement to assist travel back to Taiwan. On September 23, 2002, an e-mail relayed through TECO Houston warned the ROC government that there was a possibility of a terrorist attack. In 2005 Lieutenant Governor of Louisiana Mitch Landrieu and Kip Holden, Mayor-President of East Baton Rouge Parish, Louisiana, met with a delegation of TECO Houston officials to negotiate Taiwanese business interests in Louisiana.

See also

 Taipei Economic and Cultural Representative Office in the United States
 Diplomatic missions of the Republic of China
 History of the Chinese Americans in Houston

References

External links

 Taipei Economic and Cultural Office in Houston
 Taipei Economic and Cultural Office in Houston Cultural Division

China, Republic of
Houston
Taiwan–United States relations